Ukraine's 8th electoral district is a Verkhovna Rada constituency in the Autonomous Republic of Crimea. Established in its current form in 2012, it includes the town of Sudak, as well as Bilohirsk Raion, Nyzhniohirskyi Raion, Sovietskyi Raion, and parts of Simferopol Raion. The constituency is home to 145,241 registered voters, and has 154 polling stations. Since the Annexation of Crimea by the Russian Federation in 2014, the seat has been vacant.

The constituency is surrounded by the 6th district to the east, the 3rd district to the north, the 2nd and 10th districts to the southwest, and the 7th district to the south. It has two coastlines, on the Sea of Azov in the south and on the Syvash in the northeast.

Members of Parliament

Elections

2012

See also
Electoral districts of Ukraine
Foreign electoral district of Ukraine

References

Electoral districts of Ukraine
Constituencies established in 2012